Feel the Sound is the fifth studio album by the indie pop band Imperial Teen. It was released in 2012 on Merge Records. The follow-up to 2007's The Hair the TV the Baby and the Band, the album was recorded while members of the band were living variously in San Francisco, Los Angeles, and New York City.  While previous albums had been produced by Steven McDonald of Redd Kross, Feel the Sound is self-produced.

Reception

Feel the Sound received positive reviews from critics. On Metacritic, the album holds a score of 71/100 based on 21 reviews, indicating "generally favorable reviews."

Track listing

References

2012 albums
Merge Records albums
Imperial Teen albums